Jack W. Williams is an American politician. He is a member of the Alabama Senate representing the 34th District, since 2018.  He was a member of the Alabama House of Representatives from the 102nd District, serving since 2014. He is a member of the Republican party.

References

Living people
Republican Party members of the Alabama House of Representatives
21st-century American politicians
Year of birth missing (living people)
Republican Party Alabama state senators